Ivor Browne is an Irish retired psychiatrist, author, former Chief Psychiatrist of the Eastern Health Board, and Professor emeritus of psychiatry at University College Dublin. He is best known for his theory of trauma as being at the root cause of many psychiatric diagnoses, as well as his early therapeutic use of psychedelics. He is also known for his opposition to traditional psychiatry, and his scepticism about psychiatric drugs.

Early life and education
Ivor Browne was born in 1929 to a middle-class family from Sandycove, Dublin. He said that he was a dreamy, often miserable child. He attended secondary school at Blackrock College, where he discovered jazz music, and began playing the trumpet. After Blackrock College, he went to a secretarial school, and gained admission to the Royal College of Surgeons. He said that his intention was to become a jazz musician and that he only took up medicine to please his parents. During his time in the college of surgeons, he had several bouts of tuberculosis, which diverted him from being a musician.

Career
In 1955, he became a qualified doctor. According to Browne, his professor of medicine in the Richmond Hospital told him that: "You're only fit to be an obstetrician or a psychiatrist." He had little interest in general medicine, and decided to become a psychiatrist. He started his internship in a neurosurgical unit, where he assisted a surgeon. He said of his work there: 

Browne went on to work both in the UK and in the US; He was awarded a scholarship to study public and community mental health in Harvard. After returning to Ireland, he became the fifth Medical Superintendent of Grangegorman Mental Hospital (St. Brendan's) in 1966
and he was made Professor of psychiatry at University College Dublin and Chief Psychiatrist of the Eastern Health Board. He only retired from St Brendan's Hospital in the mid 1990s.

Work on trauma 
In his book Ivor Browne, the Psychiatrist: Music and Madness, he speaks of the concept of trauma stored in the body as 'the frozen present', unprocessed emotions, a concept he had originally published decades before. At the time, his work received very little attention from the psychiatric profession, however his work paved the way for the later work of Dr Gabor Mate and Dr Bessel Van der Kolk on trauma.

Ivor’s idea of trauma of "the frozen present" becomes a key part to understanding how he looks at psychiatric and psychotherapeutic work.  In an article published in the Network Ireland magazine, Ivor explains his attitude to trauma.

His work influenced on trauma influenced, and was influenced by, the work of Dr Stan Grof.  In 1985, Ivor published an article in the Irish Journal of Psychiatry, entitled "Psychological Trauma, or Unexperienced Experience" which at the time receive no citations. Stan Grof believed in the importance of Ivor Browne's work, and republished the article in Revision magazine in 1990.

Attitude to drugs

Browne experimented with LSD as a means to encourage regression experiences both in his personal life and professionally. He has campaigned against what he sees as an overuse of medications in modern psychiatry. He said: 
He has used psychiatric medications with his patients, but he says that he uses a fraction of the drugs prescribed by modern psychiatrists.

Community work
Browne set up the Irish Foundation for Human Development, and started the first community association in Ireland in Ballyfermot, which worked to try to turn it into a thriving community.

References

Bibliography
 Ivor Browne, Music and Madness (Cork, Cork University Press, 2010).

Irish psychiatrists
Academics of University College Dublin
1929 births
20th-century Irish people
21st-century Irish people
Possibly living people
Medical doctors from Dublin (city)
People educated at Blackrock College
People from Sandycove